Prytula, or Pritula, is a surname which may refer to:
 Bill Pritula (1922–2006),  American football player
 Olena Prytula (born 1967), Ukrainian journalist
 Ostap Prytula (born 2000), Ukrainian football player
 Sarah-Yvonne Prytula (born 1984), Australian figure skater
 Serhiy Prytula (born 1981), Ukrainian TV presenter

See also
 

Ukrainian-language surnames